Thomas R. Skelton was a lighting designer.

Thomas Skelton may also refer to:

Tommy Skelton (1856–1900), jockey
Thomas Skelton (MP died 1416), MP for Cambridgeshire and Hampshire
Thomas Skelton House, Falmouth, Maine
Thomas de Skelton, MP for Cumberland (UK Parliament constituency)
Tom Skelton, character in the film 92 in the Shade

See also
Thomas Shelton (disambiguation), often alternative spelling for Skelton in medieval/early modern period